Edmund Fabry (20 February 1892 – 14 November 1939) was a German architect. His work was part of the architecture event in the art competition at the 1936 Summer Olympics.

References

1892 births
[[Category:1997
 deaths]]
20th-century German architects
Olympic competitors in art competitions
People from Aurich (district)